Ping Zhou is an electrical engineer at ANSYS Incorporated in Canonsburg, Pennsylvania. He was named a Fellow of the Institute of Electrical and Electronics Engineers (IEEE) in 2016 for his contributions to finite element methods applied to electromagnetic devices and electrical machines.

References 

Fellow Members of the IEEE
Living people
Year of birth missing (living people)
Place of birth missing (living people)